Cynthia Nan Sayer (born May 20, 1962) is an American jazz banjoist, singer and a founding member of Woody Allen's New Orleans Jazz Band.

Career
A native of Waltham, Massachusetts, Sayer spent her early childhood in Wayland, Massachusetts and the remainder of her youth in Scotch Plains, New Jersey. She played piano from the age of six through her college years and also studied viola, drums, guitar, and banjo. She graduated from Scotch Plains-Fanwood High School and was inducted into the school's hall of fame in 2016.  She sang in school and community theater and graduated Magna Cum Laude from Ithaca College with a degree in English. Sayer has worked with Woody Allen, Milt Hinton, Dick Hyman, Bucky Pizzarelli, George Segal, Dick Wellstood, the New York Philharmonic, and The Metropolitan Opera Orchestra.

Award and honors
 National Four-String Banjo Hall of Fame, 2006

Discography
 The Jazz Banjo of Cynthia Sayer Vol. 1 (New York Jazz, 1987)
 More Jazz Banjo Vol. 2 (New York Jazz, 1989)
 Forward Moves (Yerba Buena, 1992)
 Jazz at Home (Jazzology, 1997)
 String Swing (Jazzology, 2000)
 Souvenirs (Plunk, 2002)
 Attractions with Bucky Pizzarelli (Plunk, 2007)
 Joyride (Plunk, 2013)

With the New York Banjo Ensemble
 Plays Gershwin (Kicking Mule, 1982)

As guest
 Woody Allen, Wild Man Blues (RCA Victor, 1998)
 Peter Ecklund, Strings Attached (Arbors, 1996)
 Tony Trischka, World Turning (Rounder, 1995)
 Terry Waldo, Let It Shine (Stomp Off, 2003)

Books
 You're IN The Band''' (Cynthia Sayer Music, 2016)
 The Swinging Solos Of Elmer Snowden' (Cynthia Sayer Music, 2021)

See also
 Banjo Hall of Fame Members
 List of banjo players

References

 Sources 
 The Mississippi Rag'', "Cynthia Sayer, Banjoist from the Big Apple", by George A. Borgman, June 1994.

External links 
 Official site
 Woody Allen & His New Orleans Jazz Band

Living people
1962 births
Jazz musicians from Massachusetts
Jazz musicians from New Jersey
People from Scotch Plains, New Jersey
People from Waltham, Massachusetts
American jazz banjoists
American women jazz musicians
American women jazz singers
American jazz singers
Scotch Plains-Fanwood High School alumni
21st-century American women